Saint Boniface—Saint Vital (formerly Saint Boniface) is a federal electoral district in Winnipeg, Manitoba that has been represented in the House of Commons of Canada since 1925.

The district covers roughly the southern portion of the city of Winnipeg, east of the Red River. In particular, it contains the Franco-Manitoban community of Saint Boniface and roughly the northern two-thirds of the community of St. Vital. The riding (as federal electoral districts are called in Canada) has a sizeable French population (16% according to the last census) and was a Liberal Party stronghold for most of its history. However, Conservative Shelly Glover, a Winnipeg police sergeant, won it in 2008 and three years later became the first centre-right MP in the riding's history to be re-elected.

It is the only riding in Western Canada that regularly elects francophone candidates to parliament.

History

In 1996, its English name was changed from "St. Boniface" to "Saint Boniface".

In 2008, Conservative candidate and Winnipeg police officer Shelly Glover, defeated Liberal incumbent Raymond Simard, who had held the seat since a 2002 by-election.  She easily defeated Simard in a 2011 rematch, becoming the first centre-right MP to win a second full term in the riding's history.

Saint Boniface was renamed "Saint Boniface—Saint Vital" during the 2012 electoral redistribution, losing territory to Winnipeg South and Elmwood—Transcona while gaining territory from Winnipeg South.  The riding reverted to form when Glover retired in 2015, when Liberal candidate Dan Vandal, who represented much of Saint Boniface on Winnipeg City Council, won it resoundingly as part of a Liberal near-sweep of Winnipeg.

Name changes
The federal riding's name has undergone various changes since its creation in 1924.

Members of Parliament

The riding has elected the following Members of Parliament:

Election results

Saint Boniface—Saint Vital (2012-present)

Saint Boniface (1996-2012)

St. Boniface (1924-1996)

See also
 St. Boniface (provincial electoral district)
 List of Canadian federal electoral districts
 Past Canadian electoral districts

References

Notes

External links

2011 results from Elections Canada
 Expenditures – 2008
Detailed riding map of Saint Boniface from Elections Canada

Manitoba federal electoral districts
Politics of Winnipeg
Saint Boniface, Winnipeg
St. Vital, Winnipeg